The Pimple Hills are a range of the New York-New Jersey Highlands region of the Appalachian Mountains.

Geography
The Pimple Hills lie between the Sparta Valley on the southeast, drained by the Wallkill River, and Germany Flats to the northwest, a portion of the Kittatinny Valley.

Geology
The Pimple Hills are part of the Reading Prong of the New England Upland subprovince of the New England province of the Appalachian Highlands.  The rocks that form the Pimple Hills are comprised from the same belt that make up other mountains nearby.  This belt, i.e. the Reading Prong, consists of ancient crystalline metamorphic rocks.  The New England province as a whole, along with the Blue Ridge province further south, are often together referred to as the Crystalline Appalachians.  The Crystalline Appalachians extend as far north as the Green Mountains of Vermont and as far south as the Blue Ridge Mountains, although a portion of the belt remains below the Earth's surface through part of Pennsylvania.  The Crystalline Appalachians are distinct from the parallel Sedimentary Appalachians which run from Georgia to New York.  The nearby Kittatinny Mountains are representative of these sedimentary formations.

History
An 1834 description read,

References

Landforms of Sussex County, New Jersey
Ridges of New Jersey